Edgars "Deer" Briedis (born 13 June 1983, in Valmiera) is a Latvian rock bass guitarist.

He is the bassist of the Latvian rock band Crow Mother.

References

1983 births
Living people
Latvian musicians